Tournaments include international (FIBA), professional (club) and amateur and collegiate levels.

Events
February 21: The International Basketball Federation lifts the suspension of the Philippines as it recognizes the new basketball federation.
July 20: The NBA acknowledges that the U.S. FBI is investigating whether referee Tim Donaghy bet on NBA games, including those he officiated.

Tournaments

Men's tournaments

Olympic qualifiers
Boldfaced entries qualify for the Olympics; italicized entries will participate in a wild-card competition.
FIBA Africa Championship 2007 at Angola

FIBA Americas Championship 2007 at Las Vegas, United States

FIBA Asia Championship 2007 at Tokushima, Japan

EuroBasket 2007 at Spain

FIBA Oceania Championship 2007 at Australia

Other tournaments
All-Africa Games at Algeria

Pan American Games at Rio de Janeiro, Brazil

Southeast Asian Games at Nakhon Ratchasima, Thailand

Southeast Asia Basketball Association Championship 2007 at Ratchaburi, Thailand

 and  advanced to the FIBA Asia Championship.

Women's tournaments

Olympic qualifiers
FIBA Africa Championship for Women 2007 at Senegal

FIBA Americas Championship for Women 2007 at Valdivia, Chile

FIBA Asia Championship for Women 2007 at Incheon, South Korea

EuroBasket Women 2007 at Italy

 qualifies for the 2008 Olympics.
FIBA Oceania Championship for Women 2007 at Dunedin, New Zealand

Other tournaments
Pan American Games at Rio de Janeiro, Brazil

Southeast Asian Games at Nakhon Ratchasima, Thailand

Southeast Asia Basketball Association Championship for Women 2007 at Phuket, Thailand

Youth tournaments
FIBA Under-19 World Championship at Novi Sad, Serbia:

FIBA Under-19 World Championship for Women at Bratislava, Slovakia

FIBA Under-21 World Championship for Women at Moscow Oblast, Russia

Club championships

Transnational seasons

National championships
Men:
 NBA
Season:
Western Conference and League: Dallas Mavericks (67-15)
Eastern Conference: Detroit Pistons (53-29)
Other Division champions: Phoenix Suns, Utah Jazz, Toronto Raptors and Miami Heat.
Finals: The San Antonio Spurs defeat the Cleveland Cavaliers 4-0 in the best-of-seven finals. Finals MVP: Tony Parker
 National Basketball League, 2006-07 season: Brisbane Bullets defeat the Melbourne Tigers 3-1 in the best-of-five Grand Final.
 Chinese Basketball Association, 2006-07 season: Bayi Rockets defeated the Guangdong Southern Tigers 4-1 in the best-of-seven finals.
 Croatian League: Cibona defeat Zadar 3-2 in the best-of-five finals.
 Estonian League, 2006–07: TÜ/Rock defeat Kalev/Cramo 4–2 in the best-of-7 final.
 French League: Roanne defeat Nancy 81-74 in the one-off final.
 German Bundesliga: Brose Baskets defeat Artland Dragons 3-1 in the best-of-five finals.
 Greek League: Panathinaikos defeat Olympiacos 3-2 in the best-of-five finals.
 Iranian Super League, 2006-07 season: Saba Battery defeat Petrochimi 2–0 in the best-of-three final.
 Israel Premier League: Maccabi Tel Aviv defeat Hapoel Jerusalem 80-78 in the one-off final.
 Italian Serie A: Montepaschi Siena sweep VidiVici Bologna 3-0 in the best-of-five finals.
 Lithuanian LKL: Žalgiris defeat Lietuvos Rytas 4-2 in the best-of-seven finals.
 Montenegro League: Budućnost Podgorica sweep Lovćen 3-0 in the best-of-five finals.
 Philippine Basketball Association, 2006-07 season:
Philippine Cup: Barangay Ginebra Kings defeat the San Miguel Beermen 4-2 in the best-of-seven finals. Finals MVP: Jayjay Helterbrand
Fiesta Conference: Alaska Aces defeat the Talk 'N Text Phone Pals 4-3 in the best-of-seven finals. Finals MVP: Willie Miller
 Polish League: Prokom Trefl Sopot defeat Turów Zgorzelec 4-1 in the best-of-seven finals.
 Russian Super League: CSKA Moscow sweep UNICS Kazan 3-0 in the best-of-five finals.
 Serbia Super League: Partizan defeat Red Star 3-1 in the best-of-five finals.
 Slovenian League: Helios Domžale defeat Union Olimpija 3-2 in the best-of-five finals.
 Spanish ACB:
Season: TAU Cerámica topped the league standings.
Playoffs: Real Madrid defeat Winterthur FCB 3-1 in the best-of-five Finals.
 Turkish Basketball League: Fenerbahçe Ülker sweep Efes Pilsen 4-0 in the best-ot-seven finals.
 British Basketball League, 2006-07:
Season: Guildford Heat win the regular-season crown.
Playoffs: Newcastle Eagles defeat the Scottish Rocks 95-82 to win the postseason playoffs.
  Adriatic League: Partizan defeat FMP 2-0 in the best-of-three finals.

Women:
 2007 WNBA Finals: The Phoenix Mercury defeated the Detroit Shock, 3-2. Finals MVP: Cappie Pondexter
EuroLeague Women 2006-07:  Spartak Moscow Region defeated  Ros Casares Valencia, 76-62 in the final.

College
Men:
 NCAA
Division I: Florida 84, Ohio State 75
Most Outstanding Player: Corey Brewer, Florida
National Invitation Tournament:  West Virginia 78, Clemson 73
Division II: Barton 77, Winona State 75
Division III: Amherst 80, Virginia Wesleyan 67
 NAIA
NAIA Division I:  Oklahoma City 79, Concordia (CA) 71
NAIA Division II: MidAmerica Nazarene (Kan.) 78, Mayville State (N.D.) 60
 NJCAA
Division I: Midland CC TX 94, Chipola JC 75
Division II: Mott Community College (Flint, MI) 75, Monroe Community College (Rochester, NY) 61
Division III: Sullivan County 74, Northland CTC 68
 UAAP Men's: La Salle beat UE 2-0 in the best-of-3 finals
 NCAA (Philippines) Seniors': San Beda beat Letran, 2-0 in the best-of-3 finals
Women:
 NCAA
Division I: Tennessee 59, Rutgers 46
Most Outstanding Player: Candace Parker, Tennessee
WNIT: Wyoming 72, Wisconsin 56
Division II:  Southern Connecticut 61, Florida Gulf Coast 45
Division III DePauw 55, Washington University in St. Louis 52
 NAIA
NAIA Division I: Lambuth (Tenn.) 63, Cumberla nd (Tenn.) 50
NAIA Division II: Indiana Wesleyan 48, College of the Ozarks 34
 NJCAA
Division I: Odessa College TX 73, Central Arizona College 50
Division II: Kirkwood Community College 84, Kankakee Community College 55
Division III: Anoka-Ramsey CCMinn. 52, Mohawk Valley CC NY 44
 UAAP Women's: Ateneo beat UP, 2-0 in the best-of-3 series

Prep
 USA Today Boys Basketball Ranking #1: Lincoln High School, Dallas, Texas
 USA Today Girls Basketball Ranking #1: Collins Hill High School, Suwanee, Georgia
 NCAA (Philippines) Juniors: San Sebastian beat Letran, 2-0 in the best-of-3 series
 UAAP Juniors: Zobel beat Ateneo, 2-0 in the best-of-3 series

Awards and honors

Naismith Memorial Basketball Hall of Fame
Class of 2007:
 Van Chancellor
 Pedro Ferrandiz
 Phil Jackson
 Mirko Novosel
 Marvin Rudolph
 Texas Western
 Roy Williams

Women's Basketball Hall of Fame
Class of 2007
 Daedra Charles-Furlow
 Bridgette Gordon
 Mel Greenberg
 Pamela Kelly-Flowers
 Andy Landers
 Andrea Lloyd-Curry

FIBA Hall of Fame
Class of 2007
Players

 Alexander Belov
 Amaury Pasos
 Ann Meyers
 Bill Russell
 Dražen Dalipagić
 Dražen Petrović
 Emiliano Rodríguez

 Fernando Martín
 Hortência Marcari
 Ivo Daneu
 Krešimir Ćosić
 Liliana Ronchetti
 Mirza Delibašić
 Nikos Galis

 Oscar Furlong
 Pierluigi Marzorati
 Radivoj Korać
 Sergei Belov
 Teófilo Cruz
 Uljana Semjonova
 Vanya Voynova

Coaches
 Aleksandar Nikolić
 Alexander Gomelsky
 Antonio Díaz-Miguel
 Dean Smith
 Giancarlo Primo
 Henry "Hank" Iba
 Lidia Alexeyeva
 Ranko Žeravica
 Togo Renan Soares "Kanela"
 Vladimir Kondrashin
Referees
 Allen Rae
 Ervin Kassai
 Mario Hopenhaym
 Obrad Belošević
 Pietro Reverberi
 Renato Righetto
 Vladimir Kostin
Contributors
 Borislav Stankovic

Professional
Men
NBA Most Valuable Player Award: Dirk Nowitzki, Dallas Mavericks
NBA Rookie of the Year Award: Brandon Roy, Portland Trail Blazers
NBA Defensive Player of the Year Award: Marcus Camby, Denver Nuggets
NBA Sixth Man of the Year Award: Leandro Barbosa, Phoenix Suns
NBA Most Improved Player Award: Monta Ellis, Golden State Warriors
NBA Coach of the Year Award: Sam Mitchell, Toronto Raptors
FIBA Europe Player of the Year Award: Andrei Kirilenko, Utah Jazz and 
Euroscar Award: Tony Parker, San Antonio Spurs and 
Mr. Europa: Dimitris Diamantidis, Panathinaikos and 
Women
WNBA Most Valuable Player Award: Lauren Jackson, Seattle Storm
WNBA Defensive Player of the Year Award: Lauren Jackson, Seattle Storm
WNBA Rookie of the Year Award: Armintie Price, Chicago Sky
WNBA Sixth Woman of the Year Award: Plenette Pierson, Detroit Shock
WNBA Most Improved Player Award: Janel McCarville, New York Liberty
Kim Perrot Sportsmanship Award: Tully Bevilaqua, Indiana Fever
WNBA Coach of the Year Award: Dan Hughes, San Antonio Silver Stars
WNBA All-Star Game MVP: Cheryl Ford, Detroit Shock
WNBA Finals Most Valuable Player Award: Cappie Pondexter, Phoenix Mercury
FIBA Europe Player of the Year Award: Anete Jēkabsone-Žogota,  Dynamo Moscow and

Collegiate 
 Combined
Legends of Coaching Award: Gene Keady, Purdue
 Men
John R. Wooden Award: Kevin Durant, Texas
Naismith College Coach of the Year: Tony Bennett, Washington State
Frances Pomeroy Naismith Award: Tre Kelley, South Carolina
Associated Press College Basketball Player of the Year: Kevin Durant, Texas
NCAA basketball tournament Most Outstanding Player: Mario Chalmers, Kansas
USBWA National Freshman of the Year: Kevin Durant, Texas
Associated Press College Basketball Coach of the Year: Tony Bennett, Washington State
Naismith Outstanding Contribution to Basketball: Bob Knight
 Women
John R. Wooden Award: Candace Parker, Tennessee
Naismith College Player of the Year: Lindsey Harding, Duke
Naismith College Coach of the Year: Gail Goestenkors, Duke
Wade Trophy: Candace Parker, Tennessee
Frances Pomeroy Naismith Award: Lindsey Harding, Duke
Associated Press Women's College Basketball Player of the Year: Candace Parker, Tennessee
NCAA basketball tournament Most Outstanding Player: Candace Parker, Tennessee
Basketball Academic All-America Team: Chrissy Givens, Middle Tennessee
Carol Eckman Award: Theresa Grentz, Illinois
Maggie Dixon Award: Krista Kilburn-Steveskey, Hofstra
USBWA National Freshman of the Year: Tina Charles, Connecticut
Associated Press College Basketball Coach of the Year: Gail Goestenkors, Duke
List of Senior CLASS Award women's basketball winners: Alison Bales, Duke
Nancy Lieberman Award: Lindsey Harding, Duke
Naismith Outstanding Contribution to Basketball: Kay Yow

Deaths
 January 9 — Zeke Zawoluk, American college All-American (St. John's) and NBA player (Indianapolis Olympians, Philadelphia Warriors) (born 1930)
 February 7 — Ray Corley, American NBA player (born 1928)
 February 8 — Shelby Metcalf, American college coach (Texas A&M) (born 1930)
 February 21 — Barry Stevens, American NBA player (born 1963)
 February 22 — Dennis Johnson, American Hall of Fame NBA player (Seattle SuperSonics, Phoenix Suns, Boston Celtics) (born 1954)
 March 1 — Bobby Speight, All-American at NC State (born 1930)
 March 20 — Frank Baird, American NBL player (Indianapolis Kautskys) (born 1912)
 April 13 — Steve Malovic, American NBA player (born 1956)
 April 18 — Harry Miller, Toronto Huskies player (born 1923)
 May 27 — Howard Porter, former NBA player and 1971 NCAA Tournament Most Outstanding Player (born 1948)
 June 10 — Jim Killingsworth, American college coach (Idaho State, Oklahoma State, TCU) (born 1923)
 June 11 — Ray Mears, American college coach (Tennessee) (born 1926)
 July 26 — Skip Prosser, College coach of the Wake Forest Demon Deacons (born 1950)
 August 17 — Eddie Griffin, former Seton Hall and NBA player (born 1982)
 August 22 — Butch van Breda Kolff, former college and NBA coach (born 1922)
 September 14 — Dave Humerickhouse, All-American college player (Bradley) (born 1924)
 September 17 — Charlotte Lewis, American Olympic women's basketball player (born 1955)
 November 28 — Bob Simpson, Canadian Olympic player (1952) (born 1930)
 November 29 — Ralph Beard, All-American at Kentucky.  Two-time National Champion and Olympic Gold Medalist (born 1927)
 December 13 — Jack Thornton, American NBL player (Hammond Ciesar All-Americans, Sheboygan Red Skins) (born 1914)
 December 28 — Aidin Nikkhah Bahrami, Iran national basketball team player (born 1982)

See also
 Timeline of women's basketball

References

External links